Tom Parlon (born 19 August 1953) is a former Irish Progressive Democrats politician. He was a Teachta Dála (TD) for the Laois–Offaly constituency from 2002 to 2007 and was also the Minister of State at the Department of Finance with special responsibility for the Office of Public Works. He later served as the Director General of the Construction Industry Federation of Ireland.

Early life and politics
Parlon was educated at Coolderry National School, Roscrea CBS, and Gurteen College. He was elected to Dáil Éireann for the Laois–Offaly constituency at the 2002 general election as a Progressive Democrats candidate. He was appointed Minister of State on one of his first days in the Dáil. Previous to being a politician Parlon held a number of senior positions in the Irish Farmers' Association, including Deputy President (1991–1993) and President (1997–2001). In the period before the 2002 general election, it was some time before he could make up his mind whether to stand for Fine Gael or the Progressive Democrats. He became President of the Progressive Democrats party in September 2006 after Michael McDowell took over as party leader. He lost his seat at the 2007 general election despite running one of the most expensive campaigns in the election.

He announced on 10 July 2007, that he was quitting politics and would not seek a nomination to Seanad Éireann, or to contest the leadership of the Progressive Democrats. Instead he took up the position of Director General of the Irish Construction Industry Federation, receiving an annual salary of €250,000.

Complaint to Standards Commission
A complaint about Parlon appearing in an advertisement for animal feed was made to the Standards in Public Office Commission. The Commission advised that it is not appropriate for a serving office holder to be associated with the commercial promotion of particular products unconnected with the official duties of that person.

Further Complaints
In December 2003 Parlon was attacked by fellow ministers for claiming the decentralisation plan being implemented in Laois was because of his decision, when in fact he had no input into the plan at all and was only a junior by-stander. Also in taking up his position as Director General of the Construction Industry Federation in 2007, after having a prominent position in the Office of Public Works have led to accusations of a conflict of interest..

In 2008, Parlon publicly took credit for effecting a policy reversal by the Department of Finance on the procurement procedure for State building projects. After his lobbying, Minister for Finance Brian Lenihan agreed to allow €150m of water service projects to go ahead under old "costs plus" contracts rather than the "fixed price" contracts. In fact, the reversal was due to an administrative decision amongst local authorities and not as a consequence of any lobbying.

Post political career

Construction Industry Federation
Parlon was appointed as Director General of the Construction Industry Federation (CIF) in July 2007. His appointment coincided with the downturn in the construction sector and the economy in general.

As head of the CIF, Parlon was strongly opposed to the formation of NAMA, which has taken over many of the distressed loans of members of the CIF. In May 2009, the Sunday Independent newspaper reported that Parlon was raising a multimillion-euro warchest from developers to fund research to look at ways to oppose the formation of the National Asset Management Agency and potentially take a legal action against it.

The warchest was to be overseen through a sub-committee within CIF. This sub-committee and the collection of the €2,000 levy was opposed by the Irish Property Council which stated: "It is not understood if or how a sub-committee of the CIF has a mandate which allows it represent property developers in all of the current areas of concern as against the interests of the construction industry as a whole".

Parlon's tenure in CIF has also seen the deterioration in industrial relations in the construction industry. On 7 July 2009, in an interview with Pat Kenny, Parlon controversially referred to striking electricians and their union as "lunatics".

By 12 July 2009, Parlon and the Electrical Contractors Association had agreed to pay the striking electricians a pay increase of 4.9%, rather than a pay cut of 10% which he had publicly demanded. The pay increases had been due for a number of years.

In November 2010, a leading member of the Construction Industry Federation, and the NAMA sub-committee openly called for Parlon's resignation. In an email to members, Cork-based developer Michael O'Flynn noted that Parlon had publicly "attack[ed] and ridicule[d] the very people he purports to represent. If we must take abuse from other members of society, so be it; but for abuse to be self-inflicted by a man whose salary we pay is unforgivable."

Possible return to politics
In September 2010, Parlon was quoted as "thinking about" seeking the Fine Gael nomination for the Laois–Offaly constituency following the decision of the Offaly-based Olwyn Enright not to seek re-election to Dáil Éireann. In the event he did not contest the election.

References

1953 births
Living people
Members of the 29th Dáil
20th-century Irish farmers
Politicians from County Offaly
Ministers of State of the 29th Dáil
Progressive Democrats TDs
21st-century Irish farmers